Edward Baker or Ted Baker may refer to:

Sportspeople
Edward Baker (cricketer, born 1892) (1892–1969), English cricketer
Edward Baker (Kent cricketer) (1846–1913), English cricketer
Edward Baker (Worcestershire cricketer) (1910–1992), English cricketer
Edward Baker (South African cricketer) (1930–1993), South African cricketer
Ed Baker (quarterback) (born 1948), American football player
Ed Baker (American football coach) (1931–2013), American football player and coach
Ted Baker (footballer) (1901–1986), Aussie rules footballer
Edward Baker (American football) (died 1959), American football player and coach

Others
Edward Baker (British politician) (c. 1775–1862), British Conservative Member of Parliament
Edward Dickinson Baker (1811–1861), British-born American senator and soldier
Edward Baker Lincoln (1846–1850), son of Abraham Lincoln, named after Edward Dickinson Baker
Edward J. Baker (1868–1959), American philanthropist from St. Charles, Illinois
E. C. Stuart Baker (1864–1944), British ornithologist and police officer
Edward L. Baker Jr. (1865–1913), American soldier and Medal of Honor recipient
Edward M. Baker (1875–1957), American investment broker
Eddie Baker (1897–1968), American actor
Ted Baker (chemist) (born 1942), New Zealand scientist
Ted Baker (publican) (1872–1936), South Australian sportsman
Edward Norman Baker (1857–1913), British colonial officer; Lieutenant Governor of Bengal

See also
Edward Baker-Duly (born 1977), South African actor
Edward Baker House, historic Queen Anne house in the city of Streator, Illinois, also known as Silas Williams House
Ted Baker, British retail company
Edmund Baker (1854–1911), American politician and businessman
Edwin Baker (disambiguation)